KS Kastrioti, also known as Kastrioti Krujë, is an Albanian football club based in the city of Krujë. The club's home ground is the Kastrioti Stadium which has a capacity of 8,000 spectators and they currently compete in the Kategoria Superiore.

History

Early history
The club was founded in 1926 as the city of Krujë's main sports club. During a brief spell in 1949, the club was dissolved, but was quickly re-established under the name of the city, Krujë. Two years later in 1951, the club was renamed Puna Krujë before reverting it back to simply Krujë again in 1958, which they later added Kastrioti to, in honour of the noble Kastrioti family of which Albania's national hero Skanderbeg hailed from.

Rise and fall (1989–2006)
For many years the club only competed in the lower divisions of Albanian football, but they managed to achieve promotion to the top tier Albanian Superliga in 1990 for the very first time. During their debut season in the top flight the club finished in 12th place out of 14 teams with a record of 12 wins, 10 draws and 17 losses. The following season they would again finish 2 places from the bottom, in 14th place out of 16 teams, a feat they would replicate the following season once again, but this time the league format had changed and the club was relegated to the Albanian First Division. The club returned to the top flight in 1995 after winning the 1994–95 First Division title and gaining promotion. However, this was only short lived as they were relegated in their first season back after finishing in penultimate place. They would have to wait 10 years to return to the Superliga once again, as they achieved promotion in the 2004–05 season after finishing 3rd in the First Division.

Recent history (2006–2011)
During the 2005–06 season, the club finished in its best league position of 8th place out of 12 teams and secured top flight football for another season. The following season they were relegated after losing in the promotion and relegation play off against KS Lushnja 4–2 on penalties after a goalless stalemate. Kastrioti were immediately promoted after finishing in 3rd place and reaching the playoffs for promotion, where they beat Partizani Tirana 1–0 to gain promotion. The club had to feature in the play off once again after finishing 9th out of 12 teams, but they beat KS Lushnja 1–0 to remain in the top flight. The following season the club finished 8th but narrowly avoided the promotion and relegation play off by goal difference.

Present time
In the summer of 2011, 75% of the club's shares were sold by the Municipality of Krujë to Alban Sport, Albania's exclusive distributor of Adidas and Reebok clothing. The remaining 25% of the club's shares were held by the Municipality of Krujë. This provided the club with greater resources to invest in the squad and to keep up with the other Superliga sides who were investing heavily at the time. The 2011–12 season proved to be the club's most successful campaign as they finished in 5th place, just one place behind reaching UEFA Europa League qualification stage. They again remained a mid table team, finishing 8th out of 14 teams in the 2012–13 season and remaining comfortably in the league.

Stadium

The stadium of KS Kastrioti is located in Krujë, Albania. Kastrioti Stadium has a capacity of 8,400 seats and the owner of the stadium is the Municipality of Krujë. During the 2018–19 Albanian Superliga, the team has to move down to Fushë-Krujë because the municipality did not renovate the stadium at the right time for the Albanian Superliga so they will play at Redi Maloku Stadium with a capacity of 3,000 seats. Kastrioti Stadium was last renovated during 2008.

Current squad

Club officials
President: Alban Vogli
Managing Director:  Shkelzen Zhilli
Board member: Gëzim Rama

Historical list of coaches

 Robert Jashari (1985-1986)
 Ilir Luarasi (1990-1995)
 Gjergji Mone (1995)
 Spartak Qose (1996)
 Ramadan Ndreu (2005–26 Sep 2006)
 Petrit Haxhia (26 Sep 2006 – 1 Apr 2007)
 Ramadan Ndreu (1 Apr 2007 – 7 Oct 2007)
 Vasil Bici (10 Oct 2007 – 3 Feb 2008)
 Ramadan Ndreu (3 Feb 2008 – Jun 2008)
 Derviš Hadžiosmanović (Jul 2008 – 1 Oct 2008)
 Ramadan Ndreu (1 Oct 2009 – 18 Apr 2012)
 Andrea Marko (18 Apr 2012 – 1 Jul 2012)
 Artan Mërgjyshi (1 Jul 2012 – 15 Oct 2012)
 Shaban Dollaku (16 Oct 2012 – 31 May 2013)
 Ramadan Ndreu (1 July 2013 – 9 Nov 2013)
 Kristaq Mile (15 Nov 2013 – 16 Feb 2014)
 Nevil Dede (16 Feb 2014 - May 2014)
 Alert Alçani (Nov 2014 – Jan 2015)
 Elvis Plori (Jul 2015 – Jun 2016)
 Samuel Nikaj (Jul 2017 - Jun 2018)
 Elvis Plori (Jul 2018 – Oct 2018)
 Stavri Nica (Oct 2018 - Jan 2019)
 Bledar Devolli (Jan 2019 - May 2019)
 Ramadan Ndreu (Jul 2019 - Dec 2021)
 Emiliano Çela (Dec 2021 - Dec 2022)
 Ardian Mema (Dec 2022 - Feb 2023)
 Emiliano Çela (Feb 2023 - )

References

Football clubs in Albania
Association football clubs established in 1926
Krujë
1926 establishments in Albania
Kategoria e Dytë clubs